Seyyed Kalam Sar (also Romanized as Seyyed Kalām Sar and Seyyed Kolāmsar) is a village in Kuhestan Rural District, Kelardasht District, Chalus County, Mazandaran Province, Iran. As of the 2006 census, its population was 32, in 7 families.

References 

Populated places in Chalus County